Devender Pal Singh (Born  Ludhiana, Punjab, India) is an Indian playback singer who made his debut in the 2012 film Luv Shuv te chicken Khurana. He first gained recognition as a singer as a participant in the edition of Indian Idol. He was finalist in the reality show Indian Idol 6 on Indian television.

Discography

Playback singing

References

Indian Idol participants
Indian male singers